To droop means to hang down, to sag, particularly if limp. Droop may refer to:

Technical usage
 Droop nose (aeronautics), an adjustable nose found on some supersonic aircraft
 Droop quota, a type of quota for counting and transferring votes in an election
 Droop speed control, a speed control mode of a prime mover driving a synchronous generator connected to an electrical grid. 
 Leading-edge droop flap, a type of high-lift device found on the wings of some aircraft
 Leading-edge droop, a feature of some aircraft wings
 LED droop, the lowering of efficiency of light-emitting diodes at higher electrical currents
 The steady-state error of a proportional controller
 Voltage droop, the intentional loss in output voltage of a power supply as it drives a load

People
 Marie Luise Droop (1890-1959), a German writer and producer
 Henry Richmond Droop (1831–1884), an English mathematician
 John Percival Droop (1882–1963), a British classical archaeologist
 Droop-E, American rapper

Fictional characters
 Droopy, cartoon character
 Drooper, a character from the television show The Banana Splits
 Droop, a muppet character from the television series The Muppet Show
 Droop-a-Long, a cartoon character from the segment Ricochet Rabbit & Droop-a-Long in The Magilla Gorilla Show

Places
 Droop, West Virginia
 Droop Hill, a mountain landform in the Kincardine and Mearns region of Aberdeenshire, Scotland
 Droop Mountain, a small mountain in the Allegheny Mountains in West Virginia, United States

Other uses
 Ptosis (disambiguation), drooping of body parts
 Droop cup, a type of bowl from Ancient Greece / Laconia, named after John Percival Droop

See also
 Drupe, a form of fruit
 Drop (disambiguation)